The State of the Union is the name of an annual address (lecture) presented by the President of the United States of America to the United States Congress.

State of the Union may also refer to:

Government
 State of the Union (European Union), an annual speech addressed by the President of the European Commission
 U.S. state, a constituent political entity of the United States (a.k.a. the "Union")
 The northern states during the American Civil War.

Conferences 

 The State of the Union (European University Institute), an annual forum for high level reflection on the European Union organised by the European University Institute (EUI).

Arts, entertainment, and media

Films
 State of the Union (film), a 1948 film by Frank Capra
 XXX: State of the Union, a 2005 film by Lee Tamahori

Literature
 State of the Union (play), a 1946 play by Russel Crouse and Howard Lindsay
 State of the Union, a 2005 novel by Douglas Kennedy

Music

Groups
 State of the Union, a band on WTII Records
 State of the Union, a band featuring Brooks Williams and Boo Hewerdine

Works
 State of the Union (album), a Dischord Records various artists compilation
 "State of the Union" (song), a song by David Ford  
 "State of the Union", a song on Siren Song of the Counter Culture, an album by punk band Rise Against

Television
 State of the Union (American TV program), an American TV news program/talk show that has aired on Sundays on CNN since 2009
 State of the Union (British TV series), a British television comedy (Series 1: 2019; Series 2: 2022)
 Tracey Ullman's State of the Union, a comedy sketch TV show

Other arts, entertainment, and media
 State of the Union, a Creators Syndicate comic

Other uses
 Australian Provincial Championship or The State of the Union, a rugby union competition

See also
 State of the State address
 Union State